General Hassen Ebrahim Mussa is a general with the Ethiopian National Defense Force (ENDF). He served as the Force Commander of the United Nations Interim Security Force for Abyei (UNISFA) from 2016–2017.

Biographical information
General Mussa is a graduate of the Open University in the United Kingdom and holds a master's degree in Business Administration. From 2005 to 2010, he served the ENDF as the Head of Foreign Relations and Military Cooperation and Peacekeeping. In addition to serving as Head of the Peacekeeping Coordination Centre for the ENDF, he served in the African Union and United Nations Mission in Darfur from 2010 to 2011.

He was appointed as Force Commander of UNISFA on 15 January 2016 by United Nations Secretary-General Ban Ki-moon. He was succeeded on 17 January 2017 by Major General Tesfay Gidey Hailemichael.

References

Ethiopian officials of the United Nations
Living people
Ethiopian generals
Year of birth missing (living people)